= Solskensholmarna =

Group of islands in Finland

Coordinates: 60°13′03″N 25°29′35″E

Solskensholmarna are islands in Finland. They are located in the Gulf of Finland and in the municipality of Porvoo in the economic region of Porvoo in the region of Uusimaa, in the southern part of the country. The islands are about 29 kilometers east of Helsinki. The area of the islands pointed by the coordinates is 1.8 hectares and its greatest length is 220 meters in a north–south direction.

== Climate ==
Continental climate prevails in the area. The average annual temperature in the area is 5 °C. The warmest month is August, when the average temperature is 16 °C, and the coldest is January, with −5 °C.
